Guillaume Fatio (11 September 1865 – 4 June 1958) was a Swiss architect. His work was part of the architecture event in the art competition at the 1912 Summer Olympics.

References

1865 births
1958 deaths
19th-century Swiss architects
20th-century Swiss architects
Olympic competitors in art competitions
Architects from Geneva